Abruzzese may refer to:
 Neapolitan language, Abruzzese Orientale Adriatico and Abruzzese Occidentale dialects from the Abruzzo region
 Abruzzo region of Italy: Abruzzese is the associated adjective

Animal breeds
 The Cane da pastore Maremmano-Abruzzese, sometimes called Cane da pastore Abruzzese or Maremma Sheepdog
 Abruzzese cattle

People
Abruzzese (surname)

See also
Abbruzzi
Abruzzi (disambiguation)